Al Sahwa (Arabic: الصحوة; The Awakening) is an Arabic language weekly newspaper published in Sana'a, Yemen. Founded in 1986 the paper has an Islamist political stance.

History and profile
Al Sahwa was established in 1986. It is one of the official media outlets of the Islah Party. Although the paper is published weekly on Thursdays, its website is updated daily. As of 2014 Rajeh Badi was the editor-in-chief of the weekly.

The paper describes itself as the voice of Islamic movement in the country. Therefore, it offers the analysis of news from an Islamic angle.

The paper's online version was the 17th most visited website for 2010 in the MENA region.

The offices of Al Sahwa in Sana'a was attacked by gunmen in May 2011. The attacks were allegedly carried out by the Yemeni military forces loyal to former President Ali Abdullah Saleh.

See also
 List of newspapers in Yemen

References

External links
 

1986 establishments in Yemen
Arabic-language newspapers
Mass media in Sanaa
Newspapers published in Yemen
Newspapers established in 1986
Weekly newspapers